Sir John Greig Latham GCMG QC (26 August 1877 – 25 July 1964) was an Australian lawyer, politician, and judge who served as the fifth Chief Justice of Australia, in office from 1935 to 1952. He had earlier served as Attorney-General of Australia under Stanley Bruce and Joseph Lyons, and was Leader of the Opposition from 1929 to 1931 as the final leader of the Nationalist Party.

Latham was born in Melbourne. He studied arts and law at the University of Melbourne, and was called to the bar in 1904. He soon became one of Victoria's best known barristers. In 1917, Latham joined the Royal Australian Navy as the head of its intelligence division. He served on the Australian delegation to the 1919 Paris Peace Conference, where he came into conflict with Prime Minister Billy Hughes. At the 1922 federal election, Latham was elected to parliament as an independent on an anti-Hughes platform. He got on better with Hughes' successor Stanley Bruce, and formally joined the Nationalist Party in 1925, subsequently winning promotion to cabinet as Attorney-General. He was also Minister for Industry from 1928, and was one of the architects of the unpopular industrial relations policy that contributed to the government's defeat at the 1929 election. Bruce lost his seat, and Latham was reluctantly persuaded to become Leader of the Opposition.

In 1931, Latham led the Nationalists into the new United Australia Party, joining with Joseph Lyons and other disaffected Labor MPs. Despite the Nationalists forming a larger proportion of the new party, he relinquished the leadership to Lyons, a better campaigner, thus becoming the first opposition leader to fail to contest a general election. In the Lyons Government, Latham was the de facto deputy prime minister, serving both as Attorney-General and Minister for External Affairs. He retired from politics in 1934, and the following year was appointed to the High Court as Chief Justice. From 1940 to 1941, Latham took a leave of absence from the court to become the inaugural Australian Ambassador to Japan. He left office in 1952 after almost 17 years as Chief Justice; only Garfield Barwick has served for longer.

Early life and education
Latham was born in Ascot Vale, a suburb of Melbourne, Australia. His father was a prominent citizen, whose achievements as secretary for the Society for the Protection of Animals were deeply respected. John Latham won a scholarship and became a successful student at Scotch College and the University of Melbourne, studying logic, philosophy and law. At one point, he was the recipient of the Supreme Court Judges' Prize. In November 1902, Latham became the first secretary of the Boobook Society (named for the southern boobook owl), a group of Melbourne academics and professionals which still meets.

In 1907, Latham played a key role in establishing the Education Act Defence League, a rationalist organisation aimed at upholding the secular provisions of the Education Act 1872. In 1909 he became the inaugural president of the Victorian Rationalist Association (VRA). He campaigned against the University of Melbourne's plans to open a divinity school.

Career

Naval career
During World War I, he was an intelligence officer in the Royal Australian Navy, holding the rank of lieutenant commander. He was the head of Naval Intelligence from 1917, and was part of the Australian delegation to the Imperial Conference and then the Versailles Peace Conference, for which he was appointed Companion of the Order of St Michael and St George (CMG) in the 1920 New Year Honours. He grew to dislike Prime Minister Billy Hughes.

Legal career

Latham had a distinguished legal career. He was admitted to the Victorian Bar in 1904, and was made a King's Counsel in 1922. In 1920, Latham appeared before the High Court representing the State of Victoria in the famous Engineers' case, alongside such people as Dr H.V. Evatt and Robert Menzies.

Political career
In 1922, Latham was elected to the Australian House of Representatives for Kooyong in eastern Melbourne. Although his philosophy was close to Hughes' Nationalist Party, Latham's experience of Hughes in Europe ensured that he would not serve under him in a Parliament. Instead, he initially aligned himself with the Liberal Union, a group of conservatives opposed to Hughes; his campaign slogan was 'Get Rid of Hughes'. On Hughes' removal in 1923, he subsequently joined the Nationalist Party (though he officially remained a Liberal until 1925).  From 1925 to 1929, he served as the Commonwealth Attorney-General in the Bruce–Page government. He wrote several books, including Australia and the British Empire in which he argued for Australia's place in the British Empire.

After Bruce lost his Parliamentary seat in 1929, Latham was elected as leader of the Nationalist Party, and hence Leader of the Opposition. He opposed the ratification of the Statute of Westminster (1931) and worked very hard to prevent it.

Two years later, Joseph Lyons led defectors from the Labor Party across the floor and merged them with the Nationalists to form the United Australia Party. Although the new party was dominated by former Nationalists, Latham agreed to become Deputy Leader of the Opposition under Lyons.  It was believed having a former Labor man at the helm would present an image of national unity in the face of the economic crisis.  Additionally, the affable Lyons was seen as much more electorally appealing than the aloof Latham, especially given that the UAP's primary goal was to win over natural Labor constituencies to what was still, at bottom, an upper- and middle-class conservative party.  Future ALP leader Arthur Calwell wrote in his autobiography, Be Just and Fear Not, that by standing aside in favour of Lyons, Latham knew he was giving up a chance to become Prime Minister.

The UAP won a huge victory in the 1931 election, and Latham was appointed Attorney-General once again. He also served as Minister for External Affairs and (unofficially) the Deputy Prime Minister. Latham held these positions until 1934, when he retired from the Commonwealth Parliament. He was succeeded as member for Kooyong, Attorney-General and Minister of Industry by Menzies, who would go on to become Australia's longest-serving Prime Minister.

Latham became the first former Opposition Leader, who did not become Prime Minister, to become a minister.
He was the only person to hold this distinction until Bill Hayden in 1983.

Judicial career

Latham was appointed Chief Justice of the High Court of Australia on 11 October 1935. From 1940 to 1941, he took leave from the Court and travelled to Tokyo to serve as Australia's first Minister to Japan. He retired from the High Court in April 1952, after a then-record 16 years in office.

As Chief Justice, Latham corresponded with political figures to an extent later writers have viewed as inappropriate.  Latham offered advice on political matters  – frequently unsolicited – to several prime ministers and other senior government figures. During World War II, he made a number of suggestions about defence and foreign policy, and provided John Curtin with a list of constitutional amendments he believed should be made to increase the federal government's power. Towards the end of his tenure, Latham's correspondence increasingly revealed his personal views on major political issues that had previously come before the court; namely, opposition to the Chifley Government's health policies and support of the Menzies Government's attempt to ban the Communist Party. He advised Earle Page on how the government could amend the constitution to legally ban the Communist Party, and corresponded with his friend Richard Casey on ways to improve the Liberal Party's platform.

According to Fiona Wheeler, there was no direct evidence that Latham's political views interfered with his judicial reasoning, but "the mere appearance of partiality is enough for concern" and could have been difficult to refute if uncovered. She particularly singles out his correspondence with Casey as "an extraordinary display of political partisanship by a serving judge." Although Latham emphasised the need for secrecy to the recipients of his letters, he retained copies of most of them in his personal papers, apparently unconcerned that they could be discovered and analysed after his death. He rationalised his actions as those of a private individual, separate from his official position, and maintained a "Janus-like divide between his public and private persona". In other fora he took pains to demonstrate his independence, rejecting speaking engagements if he believed they could be construed as political statements. Nonetheless, "many instances of Latham's advising [...] would today be regarded as clear affronts to basic standards of judicial independence and propriety".

Latham was one of only eight justices of the High Court to have served in the Parliament of Australia prior to his appointment to the Court; the others were Edmund Barton, Richard O'Connor, Isaac Isaacs, H. B. Higgins, Edward McTiernan, Garfield Barwick, and Lionel Murphy.

Personal life
He was a prominent rationalist and atheist, after abandoning his parents' Methodism at university. It was at this time that he ended his engagement to Elizabeth (Bessie) Moore, the daughter of Methodist Minister Henry Moore. Bessie later married Edwin P. Carter on the 18th May 1911 at the Northcote Methodist Church, High Street, Northcote.

Latham married Eleanor Mary Tobin, known as Ella. They had three children, two of whom predeceased him. His wife, Ella, also predeceased him. Latham died in 1964 in the Melbourne suburb of Richmond.

He was also a prominent campaigner for Australian literature, being part of the editorial board of The Trident, a small liberal journal, which was edited by Walter Murdoch. The board also included poet Bernard O'Dowd.

Latham was president of the Free Library Movement of Victoria from 1937 and served as president of the Library Association of Australia from 1950 to 1953. He was the first non-librarian to hold the position.

Legacy
The Canberra suburb of Latham was named after him in 1971. There is also a lecture theatre named after him at The University of Melbourne.

Footnotes

References

External links

1877 births
1964 deaths
Lawyers from Melbourne
Ambassadors of Australia to Japan
Attorneys-General of Australia
Australian Knights Grand Cross of the Order of St Michael and St George
Australian politicians awarded knighthoods
Australian Leaders of the Opposition
Australian ministers for Foreign Affairs
Australian members of the Privy Council of the United Kingdom
Melbourne Law School alumni
Nationalist Party of Australia members of the Parliament of Australia
United Australia Party members of the Parliament of Australia
Members of the Australian House of Representatives for Kooyong
Members of the Australian House of Representatives
Members of the Cabinet of Australia
Royal Australian Navy officers
Australian military personnel of World War I
Chief justices of Australia
Justices of the High Court of Australia
People educated at Scotch College, Melbourne
Australian lacrosse players
Australian King's Counsel
Australian atheists
Judges from Melbourne
Liberal Party (1922) members of the Parliament of Australia
Leaders of the Nationalist Party of Australia
20th-century Australian politicians
Former Methodists
Australian former Christians
People from Ascot Vale, Victoria